Balatonőszöd is a village in Somogy county, Hungary.

It is notable primarily for the speech that Hungarian Prime Minister Ferenc Gyurcsány delivered to members of the Hungarian Socialist Party (MSZP) in 2006.

The settlement is part of the Balatonboglár wine region.

External links 
 Street map (Hungarian)

References 

Populated places in Somogy County